The women's 200 metre freestyle event at the 1968 Olympic Games took place between 21 and 22 October. This swimming event used freestyle swimming, which means that the method of the stroke is not regulated (unlike backstroke, breaststroke, and butterfly events). Nearly all swimmers use the front crawl or a variant of that stroke. Because an Olympic size swimming pool is 50 metres long, this race consisted of four lengths of the pool.

Medalists

Results

Heats
Heat 1

Heat 2

Heat 3

Heat 4

Heat 5

Heat 6

Final

Key: OR = Olympic record

References

Women's freestyle 200 metre
1968 in women's swimming
Women's events at the 1968 Summer Olympics